Félix A. Escobar (born 1901, date of death unknown) was an Argentine track and field athlete. Escobar competed in the men's 110 metres , the men's 400 metres, the men's 100 metres, and the men's 4 x 100 metres relay at the 1924 Summer Olympics.

References

1901 births
Olympic athletes of Argentina
Athletes (track and field) at the 1924 Summer Olympics
Argentine male sprinters
Year of death missing
20th-century Argentine people